Karelskoye is a rural locality (a village) in Plesetsky District, Arkhangelsk Oblast, Russia. The population was 3 as of 2012.

Geography 
Karelskoye is located on the Onega River, 78 km southwest of Plesetsk (the district's administrative centre) by road. Noviny is the nearest rural locality.

References 

Rural localities in Plesetsky District